John Wick: Chapter 3 – Parabellum (Original Motion Picture Soundtrack) is the soundtrack album to the 2019 film John Wick: Chapter 3 – Parabellum, the third instalment in the John Wick franchise, starring Keanu Reeves as the eponymous character, and is directed by Chad Stahelski, who also directed the previous instalments. Tyler Bates and Joel J. Richard, also returned as the composer for the series. The album, consisted most of Bates and Richard's score, while a song "Dance of the Two Wolves" performed by Julia Aks is also in the soundtrack. Varèse Sarabande released the soundtrack album digitally on May 17, 2019, coinciding the film's release, and physically on June 7, 2019. The two-disc vinyl edition of the soundtrack were released into a trilogy, along with the scores from previous instalments on November 15.

Critical reception 
Zanobard Reviews gave 8/10 to the score album, saying "Tyler Bates’ score to John Wick: Chapter 3 – Parabellum (what a title by the way) is pretty great. It continues in the same musical vein as the first two scores, using that unique mixture of electronics and a rather gloomy tone to both emphasize the dark character of Wick and get across the particularly dramatic nature of the films as well. This third entry also adds some new and rather interesting thematic ideas to the world of John Wick and then expertly mixes them with the original themes, and this combined with some near breathtaking action setpieces not only makes Parabellum a highly enjoyable album, but also the best John Wick score so far." Film Music Central called the score as "edgy, it’s fast-paced, but it also slows down when necessary, and it fits the film’s world perfectly" and continued "we like how Bates can insert slow moments out of nowhere, it’s easy to forget about them since most of the film is devoted to fights, but the slow moments are just as beautiful".

Track listing

Additional music 
Unlike the soundtracks for previous instalments, the soundtrack for Chapter 3 – Parabellum had featured only one song titled "Dance of the Two Wolves" performed by Julia Aks. "Bullet Holes", a song performed by the English band Bush, is only released as a promotional single and not included in the soundtrack. Other non-album singles, that featured in the film, includes: "Take You Back" by Frank Stallone, "Sad Waltz" by Anna Drubich, "Pas de Deux" (The Prince and the Sugar Plum Fairy) from The Nutcracker, "Grand Allegro" by Søren Bebe, "Ninja Re Bang Bang" by Yasutaka Nakata, "Yoga Dreampiano" by Giordana Trivellato, "Winter" (from The Four Seasons) by Antonio Vivaldi, "Fra Holbergs Tid: 11. Srabande" by Edvard Grieg.

Personnel 
Credits adapted from AllMusic.

 All music composed and produced by: Tyler Bates, Joel J. Richard
 Additional music: Lorena Perez Batista, Joanne Higginbottom
 Mixing: Wolfgang Matthes, Joel J. Richard
 Mastering: Patricia Sullivan
 Percussion: Greg Ellis
 Drums: Gil Sharone
 Music editing: Richard Henderson
 Music supervisor: Kevin Edelman
 Score preparation: Matias Ambrogi-Torbes
 Creative services co-ordinator: Cutting Edge
 Executive producer: Kevin Edelman, Cary E. Mansfield
 Music executive: Nikki Triplett

References 

2019 soundtrack albums
John Wick
Tyler Bates soundtracks
Varèse Sarabande soundtracks
Pop soundtracks
Electronic soundtracks
Rock soundtracks
2010s film soundtrack albums